Daniel or Dan Crowley may refer to:

 Daniel J. Crowley (1921–1998), American art historian and cultural anthropologist
 Dan Crowley (rugby union) (born 1965), retired Australian rugby union player
 Dan Crowley (Canadian football) (born 1973), retired Canadian football player from the United States
 Daniel Crowley (footballer) (born 1997), English footballer